The North Carolina Tar Heels men's basketball team was founded in 1910 to represent the University of North Carolina in intercollegiate competition and has participated in the sport all but one season since its inception. Over the course of the team's history, the Tar Heels' performance has ranged from losing records to undefeated seasons resulting in a national championship.

During periods of both ascendancy and mediocrity, individual North Carolina players of exceptional ability have received various accolades. In total, Tar Heels have been named to an All-America team 83 times, an All-Atlantic Coast Conference team 138 times, and an All-Southern Conference team 34 times. Of the All-America selections, thirty-seven players received first-team honors a total of fifty-eight times. Sixteen players were named consensus first-team All-Americans a total of twenty-five times.

Tar Heels have won several nationally recognized individual awards, including the Bob Cousy Award, the Senior CLASS Award, Academic All-America of the Year, and several of the National Player of the Year awards. The College Basketball Hall of Fame has inducted four former North Carolina players, and the Naismith Memorial Basketball Hall of Fame has enshrined three. Five former North Carolina head coaches have also been inducted into the College Basketball Hall of Fame.

All-Americans

Each year, numerous publications and organizations release lists of All-America teams, hypothetical rosters of players considered the best in the nation at their respective positions. Some selecting organizations choose more than one roster of All-Americans, in which case they use the terms "first team", "second team", and "third team" as appropriate. Some selectors also award honorable mentions to outstanding players who did not make any of their teams.

The National Collegiate Athletic Association (NCAA), a college sports governing body, uses officially recognized All-America selectors to determine the "consensus" selections. To earn "consensus" status, a player must win honors based on a point system computed from the four different all-America teams. The point system consists of three points for first team, two points for second team and one point for third team. No honorable mention or fourth team or lower are used in the computation.  The top five totals plus ties are first team and the next five plus ties are second team. Over time, the sources used to determine the consensus selections have changed, and since 1997, the NCAA has used these selectors to determine consensus All-Americans: Associated Press (AP), the United States Basketball Writers Association (USBWA), the Sporting News (TSN), and the National Association of Basketball Coaches (NABC).

In 1923, Cartwright Carmichael was selected to the Helms first team, which made him the first North Carolina player to be named an All-American. In addition, Carmichael became the first Tar Heel first consensus All-American. Carmichael was also named a consensus All-American in 1924, which made him the first of seven North Carolina player to receive the honor twice. Of those seven players, Jack Cobb and Tyler Hansbrough are the only Tar Heels players to achieve consensus First-team All America honors three times in their collegiate career. Fifteen other Tar Heels have earned consensus First-team All-America honors twenty-three times throughout the program's history.

All-conference honorees

Just as the media recognizes the nation's best players with All-America lists, individual athletic conferences honor their best players with "all-conference" selections. In 1921, North Carolina joined the Southern Conference (SoCon). A year later, Cartwright Carmichael and Monk McDonald became the first Tar Heels named to an All-Southern Conference team. North Carolina was a member of the league from 1921 to 1953, and twenty-two Tar Heels received All-Southern Conference honors a total of thirty-four times.

After the 1952 season, North Carolina and six other schools left the Southern Conference to form the Atlantic Coast Conference (ACC). The following year, the conference honored its inaugural season's best players with an All-ACC team. In that initial class, one Tar Heel, Jerry Vayda, was selected to the second team. Since 1953, North Carolina players have received first-team All-ACC honors a total of 73 times. Tar Heels have been named to All-ACC second or third teams an additional 64 times, although those teams have not been published continuously.

In 2002, the Atlantic Coast Conference published the "ACC 50th Anniversary Basketball Team", a list of the league's fifty best players from its first half-century as chosen by a 120-member committee. North Carolina had the most selections of the ACC members. The list included twelve former Tar Heels: Billy Cunningham, a Tar Heel forward and center from 1962 to 1965; Brad Daugherty, a center from 1982 to 1986; Walter Davis, a guard and forward from 1973 to 1977; Phil Ford, a guard from 1974 to 1978; Antawn Jamison, a forward from 1995 to 1998; Bobby Jones, a forward from 1971 to 1974; Michael Jordan, a guard from 1982 to 1984; Larry Miller, a forward from 1964 to 1968; Sam Perkins, a forward and center from 1981 to 1984; Lennie Rosenbluth, a forward from 1954 to 1957; Charlie Scott, a guard from 1967 to 1970; and James Worthy, a forward from 1979 to 1982.

All-Southern Conference

Award Recipients

Various organizations bestow awards recognizing the best player overall or at a specific position, and some of these annual awards are considered highly prestigious honors. In 1926, forward Jack Cobb was named the Helms Foundation College Basketball Player of the Year, the most outstanding intercollegiate men's basketball player in the United States. George Glamack won the Helms award for player of the year for two consecutive years, in 1940 and 1941. In 1957, the Helms Foundation bestowed its player of the year award to Lennie Rosenbluth. Guard Phil Ford won four National Player of Year awards for his efforts during the 1987–88 season. Upon the conclusion of the 1982 NCAA tournament, Tar Heel James Worthy was named NCAA basketball tournament Most Outstanding Player (NCAA MOP) for his efforts during the tournament that year. In 1983, Sporting News awarded its player of the year award to Michael Jordan. The following year, Jordan swept all the National Player of Year awards. After the 1993 NCAA tournament, guard Donald Williams was named the NCAA MOP. In 1998, Antawn Jamison was consensus National Player of Year after he won all the National Player of Year awards. In 2005, point guard Raymond Felton won the Bob Cousy Award, for the nation's best point guard. After the 2005 NCAA tournament's conclusion, Sean May was named NCAA MOP. That same year, Marvin Williams was named the National Freshman of the Year by the USBWA. The succeeding year, Tyler Hansbrough won the same award. Two years later, in 2008, Hansbrough was swept all the National Player of Year awards. In 2009, Ty Lawson won the Bob Cousy award for his efforts at the point guard position in the 2008–09 season. Hansbrough won the Senior CLASS Award which is given each year to the outstanding senior NCAA Division I Student-Athlete of the Year in men's basketball. After completing the 2009 NCAA tournament, guard Wayne Ellington was named NCAA MOP. Center and forward Tyler Zeller won the Academic All-America of the Year award in 2012. Also in 2012, Kendall Marshall won the Bob Cousy award.

Since North Carolina joined the Atlantic Coast Conference in 1953, fourteen Tar Heels have been named ACC Player of the Year fifteen times. The only Tar Heel to repeat as winner of ACC Player of the Year was Larry Miller in 1967 and 1968. The ACC Rookie of the Year title was first awarded during the 1976 season and since its creation nine North Carolina players have won the award, with the most recent being Harrison Barnes in 2011. Nine North Carolina basketball players have won the Anthony J. McKevlin Award for the ACC's male athlete of the year ten times. The lone Tar Heel to win the award twice was Phil Ford in 1977 and 1978.

After his national championship-winning season in 1957, Frank McGuire received Coach of the Year honors from the UPI and the ACC. Dean Smith won the ACC Coach of the Year eight times before retiring. Smith also won coach of the year from the NABC in 1977 for leading the Tar Heels to the National Championship Game and from the NABC in 1993 after he helped coach the Tar Heels to a national championship victory. In 1998 Bill Guthridge won the Coach of the Year awards for the Naismith, NABC, and ACC. Matt Doherty won the AP Coach of the Year award in 2001. The Commonwealth Athletic Club of Kentucky presented its Coach of the Year award, the Adolph Rupp Cup, to Roy Williams in 2006 for leading the Tar Heels to the NCAA Tournament after much of the roster due to graduation or for the NBA draft.

Players

Coaches

Hall of Fame inductees

The National Collegiate Basketball Hall of Fame has commemorated many of the sport's most outstanding and most innovative personalities. Among them are four former North Carolina players and five former North Carolina head coaches.

College Basketball Hall of Fame

Glossary

References

Citations

 
North Carolina Tar Heels basketball honorees